Eddie och Johanna is a 1993 children's book by Viveca Sundvall. The story was the basis for the plot for the 1994 SVT Christmas calendar.

Plot
Eddie travels to Lysekil to meet his aunt Soffan, and breath freash air, which is healthy because of his asthma. There he becomes friend with a girl named Johanna.

References

1993 children's books
Bohuslän in fiction
Rabén & Sjögren books
Works by Viveca Lärn
1993 Swedish novels